Pope's Urn, on Champion's Wharf at Twickenham riverside in the London Borough of Richmond upon Thames,  is a contemporary piece of public art inspired by the poetry of 18th-century Twickenham resident Alexander Pope, who is buried in the parish church that overlooks the wharf. It consists of a stylised urn on a pedestal, both made in corten steel and standing just over eight-foot (2.5 metres) high, surrounded by wooden benches inscribed with aphorisms written by Pope. It was commissioned to celebrate the 2015 Rugby World Cup, for which Twickenham Stadium was one of the venues, and was opened in a ceremony on 21 September 2015.

Pope's Urn was the initiative of Twickenham resident  Graham Henderson as public art consultant for the London-based arts charity Poet in the City. Henderson conceived the project and worked in partnership with Richmond upon Thames Council, and the architectural design practice Feilden Clegg Bradley Studios, to design, build and install it. It was unveiled by Lord True, Leader of Richmond Council, in a ceremony which included readings from Pope's works by the actor John Hannah, who is a local resident, and by the actress Dame Harriet Walter.

The sculpture is based on drawings that have survived of an urn designed by Alexander Pope for a friend's garden at Hagley Hall, Worcestershire. The original urn no longer exists.

Gallery

See also
  Graham Henderson
List of public art in the London Borough of Richmond upon Thames
 Poet in the City
 Alexander Pope
 Pope's villa

References

External links
 
 Twickenham Museum: Alexander Pope

2015 establishments in England
2015 Rugby World Cup
2015 sculptures
Aphorisms
Outdoor sculptures in London
Public art in London
Works by Alexander Pope